Pete Sampras defeated Jonas Björkman in the final, 6–3, 4–6, 6–3, 6–1 to win the singles tennis title at the 1997 Paris Open.

Thomas Enqvist was the defending champion, but lost in the semifinals to Björkman.

Seeds 
A champion seed is indicated in bold text while text in italics indicates the round in which that seed was eliminated.  All sixteen seeds received a bye into the second round.

  Pete Sampras (champion)
  Michael Chang (second round)
  Patrick Rafter (third round)
  Greg Rusedski (quarterfinals)
  Yevgeny Kafelnikov (semifinals)
  Carlos Moyà (second round)
  Sergi Bruguera (third round)
  Thomas Muster (quarterfinals)
  Marcelo Ríos (second round)
  Álex Corretja (third round)
  Gustavo Kuerten (second round)
  Jonas Björkman (final)
  Félix Mantilla (second round)
  Richard Krajicek (quarterfinals)
  Thomas Enqvist (semifinals)
  Petr Korda (third round)

Draw

Finals

Top half

Section 1

Section 2

Bottom half

Section 3

Section 4

External links
 1997 Paris Open draw

Singles